Azygiida is an order of flatworms belonging to the class Rhabditophora.

Families:
 Accacoeliidae Odhner, 1911
 Aerobiotrematidae
 Albulatrematidae
 Aphanhysteridae
 Areobiotrematidae
 Arnolidae
 Azygiidae Lühe, 1909
 Bathycotylidae Dollfus, 1932
 Bivesiculidae Yamaguti, 1934
 Botulidae
 Bunocotylidae
 Cylindrorchiidae
 Dictysarcidae Skrjabin & Guschanskaja, 1955
 Didymozoidae Monticelli, 1888
 Halipegidae
 Hemiuridae Looss, 1899
 Hirudinellidae Dollfus, 1932
 Isoparorchiidae Travassos, 1922
 Lobatovitelliovariidae
 Mabiaramidae
 Oesophagicolidae
 Pelorohelminthidae
 Ptychogonimidae Dollfus, 1937
 Sclerodistomatidae
 Sclerodistomidae Odhner, 1927
 Syncoeliidae Looss, 1899
 Tetrasteridae

References

Platyhelminthes